Wendy Curry is an American bisexual rights activist and animal rescue advocate.

Career and civil rights work 
She was the President of BiNet USA, an American national bisexual civil rights organization, a position she assumed in 2006. Previously she had served as the organization's Secretary and Vice-President. In 2009, Curry was the recipient of the Brenda Howard Memorial Award presented by the Queens Chapter of PFLAG.

Ms. Curry is also on the planning committees for the Transcending Boundaries Conference.

In 1999, Curry along with fellow U.S. bisexual rights activists Michael Page of Florida and Gigi Raven Wilbur from Texas started the observation of Celebrate Bisexuality Day. To quote Curry, "We were sitting around at one of the annual bi conventions, venting and someone, I think it was Gigi said we should have a party. We all loved the great bisexual, Freddie Mercury. His birthday was in September, so why not Sept? We wanted a weekend day to ensure the most people would do something. Gigi's birthday was Sept 23rd. It fell on a weekend day, so poof! We had a day."  
This event has grown in popularity and now a wide variety of annual celebrations take place on September 23 throughout Canada, the United States, Europe, and Australia.

She is employed as a software engineer.

Personal life 
Curry previously from Maine, now resides in New Hampshire with her husband Brian and their daughter.

See also
International Conference on Bisexuality

References

External links 
BiNet USA Main Website
North East All Retriever Rescue (NEARR) Main Website
Wendy Curry: BiNet USA article in feministing published 4 August 2007

Bisexual rights activists
American LGBT rights activists
Living people
People from Hillsborough County, New Hampshire
1966 births
Activists from New Hampshire
LGBT people from Maine